Lake Iijärvi (Inari) is a medium-sized lake in Lapland in Finland. It is located in Kaldoaivi Wilderness Area. Näätämö River flows from it to Neiden Fjord in Norway. Quite near is a similar lake Pautujärvi, although it belongs to a different main catchment area, catchment of Paatsjoki.

See also
List of lakes in Finland

References

Näätämö River basin
Lakes of Inari, Finland